Richard Beard may refer to:

Richard Beard (photographer) (1801–1885), English entrepreneur and photographer
Richard Beard (courtier) ( 1540), English courtier
Richard Beard (author) (born 1967), English writer